The Weekly Jamaica Courant, published as The Weekly Jamaica Courant, with News Foreign and Domestick, was the first newspaper published in colonial Jamaica and the West Indies, and the second regular newspaper in the British settlements of the New World. It was first published in 1718, and was disestablished in 1755, being succeeded or replaced by the Jamaica Gazette or the St. Jago de la Vega Gazette.

History

Prelude 

On 1 October 1717, Nicholas Lawes, Governor of Jamaica, requested the Board of Trade's permission for the founding of a local printing press.

Lawes presented his case personally at the Board's meeting on 10 October 1717, further adding that a press 'would be a publick convenience and advantage to commerce.'

The requested press was set up by Robert Baldwin, printer, sometime during AprilMay 1718, on Church St., Kingston. He is thought to have been guaranteed a government contract for the printing of official business, and to have chosen Kingston as his base for the greater commercial opportunities this centre offered (in contrast with Spanish Town, the administrative capital, which saw less commerce than Kingston and nearby Port Royal).

Establishment 

The Courants date of first publication is uncertain. The earliest extant issue is that of 28 May 1718, which has been proposed as the paper's first issue. An earlier issue of 11 February 1718, not extant, has also been proposed as the paper's first issue. Either issue makes the Courant the first newspaper published in the West Indies, and the second regular newspaper in the British colonies of the New World (preceded only by the Boston News-Letter of 1704).

 Run 

 Editorship 

The Courant was published by authority and passed by the censor of colonial Jamaica, Thomas Ridout. It was edited by Robert Baldwin until the first quarter of 1722; by his widow, Mary, until sometime during 1734; by their sons, Peter and Robert [Jr.], until 5 February 1746; it is unclear who edited the paper after this.

 Printing 

The Courant was usually printed in four sheets of 17 by 22 inches. Its early copy seems to have been modelled after the London Gazette, to which paper the Courant'''s first issues bore resemblance. The paper's design and format were modified in the 1720s. It was published by Robert Baldwin until the first quarter of 1722; by his widow, Mary, until sometime during 1734; by their sons, Peter and Robert [Jr.], until 5 February 1746; it is unclear who published the paper after this.

 Coverage 

The Courant covered European news (as published in British papers which were brought over to Port Royal), government business, and some local news, including prices current and shipping intelligence, in addition to advertisements. Its coverage seems to have remained unchanged throughout the paper's history.

An analysis of advertisements in extant issues of the Courant revealed that ads for runaway (black and white) slaves constituted the bulk of the paper's ads. The issue for 12 September 1722, notably, gave an account of the 28 August 1722 hurricane, which claimed 400 lives.

 Circulation 

A Courant issue cost 'one bit, or three-half-crowns a quarter.' Its audience is thought to have comprised mainly Jamaican merchants and planters. Distribution was organised by parish, with various of the press's agents taking subscriptions, and slaves delivering the paper's issues. For instance,

 Disestablishment 

The Courants date of last publication is uncertain. Its last issue is generally thought to have been published in 1755. It may have been continued by the St. Jago de la Vega Gazette, first published in 1755, or merged with or replaced by the Jamaica Gazette, first published in 1745.

 Legacy 

'[P]itifully few copies' of the Courant'' 'have survived the ravages of time, hurricane and termites.' For instance, the earliest extant issues, for 30 July 1718 and 5 August 1718, survived only due to their removal from Jamaica, as Baldwin had used these as pasteboard to bind a Royal Navy log-book due for the Board of Trade in London. In total, only 15 of the paper's issues are known.

Notes

Citations

References 

 
 
 
 
 
 
 
 
 
 

18th-century disestablishments in Jamaica
1710s establishments in Jamaica
Newspapers published in Jamaica
Publications disestablished in the 1750s
Publications established in 1718